Ashley Cox (born November 15, 1956) is an American model and actress.

Career
Cox was Playboy magazine's Playmate of the Month for its December 1977 issue. Her centerfold was photographed by Mario Casilli. Cox was one of Hugh Hefner's "Personal Playmates", a term Hefner designated women whom he dated seriously.

Cox appeared in movies such as Logan's Run (1976), Drive-In (1976), The Nude Bomb (1980), King of the Mountain (1981), Looker (1981), and Night Shift (1982).

Personal life 
She has two children and, as she told The Playboy Book in 1996:

Filmography

Film

Television

References

External links
 
 

1956 births
Living people
1970s Playboy Playmates